Thomas Grady Head (August 4, 1897 – July 7, 1965) was Attorney General of Georgia from 1943 to 1945, and an associate justice of the Supreme Court of Georgia from 1945 to 1965.

Head received his law degree from the Chattanooga College of Law. He was seen as a potential candidate for Governor of Georgia, but preferred an appointment to the state supreme court. Head was on the court during the three governors controversy.

Head died following brain surgery at the age of 67.

References

1897 births
1965 deaths
Georgia (U.S. state) Attorneys General
Justices of the Supreme Court of Georgia (U.S. state)